Goetel Glacier is a glacier flowing south between Ullmann Spur and the Precious Peaks into Martel Inlet, Admiralty Bay, on King George Island in the South Shetland Islands. It was named by the Polish Antarctic Expedition, 1980, after Professor Walery Goetel (1889–1972), a Polish geologist and conservationist.

See also
 List of glaciers in the Antarctic
 Glaciology

References

 

Glaciers of King George Island (South Shetland Islands)